is a Japanese rugby union player who plays as a prop.

References

External links
itsrugby.co.uk Profile

1995 births
Living people
Japanese rugby union players
Rugby union props
Toyota Verblitz players
Sunwolves players
Japan international rugby union players